Bank für Tirol und Vorarlberg is a regional Austrian bank with headquarters in Innsbruck. The bank is listed on the Austrian stock market. Together with Oberbank AG and BKS Bank AG, forms the so-called 3-Bank Group, a loose corporate group of credit institutions. They are mutually involved in the capital of the other banks, yet completely independent and politically independent.

External links

 

Banks of Austria
Companies based in Innsbruck